Naftalan is a spa resort and skin conditions treatment and rehabilitation hospital in Ivanić-Grad in Zagreb County, Croatia.

History
The hospital was opened in 1989 and sports 111 beds in rooms of up to three patients. Various amenities, such as a café, a bowling alley, and handball, football and tennis courts, are available to patients. The hospital is aimed at treating patients with psoriasis, atopic and contact dermatitis, and scleroderma. Naftalan is a member of the European Spas Association (ESPA).

References

External links

Poshpad LA Med Spa

Spas
Hospitals in Croatia
Tourist attractions in Zagreb County